BTHS may refer to:
Barth syndrome
Bartram Trail High School
Biotechnology High School
Brooklyn Technical High School
Burlington Township High School
Bluetooth headset
 An alternate name for tafazzin